The Dutch Caribbean Police Force (Dutch: Korps Politie Caribisch Nederland or KPCN) is the law enforcement agency of the Caribbean Netherlands.

Authority
The force operates under the authority of the Ministry of Security and Justice. While maintaining public order and carrying out relief work, under the authority of the Island Governor of the relevant public body. During the investigation of criminal offenses the police force operates under the authority of the joint Attorney General of Curaçao, Sint Maarten and the Caribbean Netherlands.

Management
Korpschef: Alwyn Braaf
Director General of Police at the Ministry of Security and Justice: A. (Sandor) F. Gaastra
Force manager: Dilan Yesilgöz
Chief Prosecutor: Henry Hambeukers

The Director General of Police at the Ministry of Security and Justice has a mandate to fulfill certain administrative tasks such as appointment, promotion, suspension and dismissal of police officers.

Organization
Most of the employees works on Bonaire. These are distributed between headquarters in Kralendijk and the stations in Ambonia and in Rincon.
On St. Eustatius there is one police station in Oranjestad and on Saba there is one police station in The Bottom and one in Windwardside. The force is organized into four divisions:
Basic Police Care;
Investigation;
Intake, Information and Operational Support;
Operations and Staff, headed by the office of the Commissioner (Dutch: Korpschef).

Ranks

List of Commissioners

See also
Europol
Law enforcement in the Netherlands

References

External links

Law enforcement in the Caribbean